Kosyakovka is a rural locality (a selo) in Krasnoyarsky Selsoviet, Sterlitamaksky District, Bashkortostan, Russia. The population was 744 as of 2010. There are 6 streets.

Geography 
Kosyakovka is located 13 km northeast of Sterlitamak (the district's administrative centre) by road. Taneyevka and Sterlitamak are the nearest rural localities.

References 

Rural localities in Sterlitamaksky District